Ballymurphy may refer to:

Northern Ireland
Ballymurphy, Belfast, known for the Ballymurphy massacre
Ballymurphy, County Antrim
Ballymurphy, County Down
Ballymurphy, County Tyrone

Republic of Ireland
Ballymurphy, County Carlow
Ballymurphy, County Clare